Coming to America is a 1988 American romantic comedy film directed by John Landis and based on a story originally created by Eddie Murphy, who also stars in the lead role. The film also co-stars Arsenio Hall, James Earl Jones, Shari Headley, and John Amos. The film was released in the United States on June 29, 1988. Eddie Murphy plays Akeem Joffer, the crown prince of the fictional African nation of Zamunda, who travels to the United States in the hopes of finding a woman he can marry and love for who she is, not for her status or for having been trained to please him.

In 1989, a pilot for a planned spin-off television series was made, although this was never picked up for a series. A sequel, Coming 2 America, was released on March 4, 2021.

Plot
In the wealthy African nation of Zamunda, crown prince Akeem Joffer grows weary of his pampered lifestyle on his 21st birthday and wishes to do more for himself. When his parents, King Jaffe and Queen Aoleon, present him with an arranged bride-to-be, Akeem takes action. Seeking an independent woman who loves him for himself and not his social status, Akeem and his best friend/personal aide, Semmi, travel to the New York City borough of Queens and rent a squalid tenement in the neighborhood of Long Island City under the guise of poor foreign students.

Beginning their search for Akeem's bride, they end up being invited by some locals to a rally raising money for the neighborhood. During the rally, Akeem encounters Lisa McDowell, who possesses all the qualities he is looking for in a woman. So, upon his insistence, he and Semmi get entry-level jobs working at the local fast-food restaurant called McDowell's, a McDonald's knockoff owned by widower Cleo McDowell, Lisa's father.

Akeem's attempts to win Lisa's love are complicated by Lisa's lazy and obnoxious boyfriend, Darryl Jenks, whose father owns Soul Glo (a Jheri curl–like hairstyling aid). After Darryl announces their engagement—without Lisa's consent—to their families, she starts dating Akeem, who claims that he comes from a family of poor goat herders.

Meanwhile, although Akeem thrives on hard work and learning how commoners live, Semmi is not comfortable with living in such meager conditions. After a dinner date with Lisa is thwarted when Semmi furnishes their apartment with a hot tub and other luxuries, Akeem confiscates his money and donates it to two homeless men. Semmi wires a telegraph to King Jaffe for more money, prompting the Joffers to travel to Queens to find him.

Cleo initially disapproves of Akeem, as he believes he is poor and therefore not good enough for his daughter. He becomes ecstatic when he discovers that Akeem is actually an extremely wealthy prince, after meeting his parents. When Akeem discovers that his parents have arrived in New York, he and Lisa go to the McDowell residence to lie low where Cleo welcomes them. After Cleo's bond with Akeem is ruined by the unexpected arrival of the Zamundan entourage, Lisa later becomes angry and confused that Akeem lied to her about his identity. Akeem explains that he wanted her to love him for who, not what, he is, even offering to renounce his throne, but Lisa, still hurt and angry, refuses to marry him. Despondent, Akeem resigns himself to the arranged marriage, but as they leave, Jaffe is reprimanded by Aoleon for clinging to outdated traditions instead of thinking of their son's happiness.

At the wedding procession, a still-heartbroken Akeem becomes surprised when his veiled bride is Lisa herself. Following the ceremony, they ride happily in a carriage to the cheers of Zamundans. Witnessing such splendor, Lisa is both surprised and touched by the fact that Akeem would have given it up just for her. Akeem offers again to abdicate if she does not want this life, but Lisa playfully declines.

Cast

 Eddie Murphy as:
 Prince Akeem Joffer, the Crown Prince of Zamunda
 Randy Watson, a soul singer with the fictional band Sexual Chocolate.
 Saul, the Jewish barbershop customer
 Clarence, the owner of the barber shop.
 Arsenio Hall as:
 Semmi, Akeem's friend
 Reverend Brown
 Morris the barber
 Extremely Ugly Girl, an unattractive female clubgoer.
 James Earl Jones as King Jaffe Joffer, Akeem's father and King of Zamunda.
 John Amos as Cleo McDowell, Akeem's employer and Lisa's father.
 Madge Sinclair as Queen Aoleon Joffer, Akeem's mother and the Queen of Zamunda.
 Shari Headley as Lisa McDowell, Cleo's older daughter and Akeem's love interest.
 Clint Smith as Sweets the barber.
 Paul Bates as Oha, a royal servant.
 Eriq La Salle as Darryl Jenks, Lisa's boyfriend whom she eventually breaks up with.
 Frankie Faison as the landlord who manages the apartment building where Akeem and Semmi live.
 Vanessa Bell as Imani Izzi, betrothed as Akeem's intended wife.
 Louie Anderson as Maurice, a McDowell's employee.
 Allison Dean as Patrice McDowell, Cleo's younger daughter and Lisa's sister.
 Sheila Johnson as a lady-in-waiting.
 Jake Steinfeld as a cab driver.
 Calvin Lockhart as Colonel Izzi, Imani's father
 Samuel L. Jackson as the Hold-Up Man, an armed robber at McDowell's.

The cast also includes: Vondie Curtis-Hall as a basketball game vendor; Garcelle Beauvais as a royal rose bearer; Victoria Dillard as a royal personal bather; as well as the film debuts of Ruben Hudson as a street hustler and Cuba Gooding Jr. as a boy getting a haircut.

Don Ameche and Ralph Bellamy reprise their roles as Mortimer and Randolph Duke respectively from Landis's Murphy-starring comedy film Trading Places (1983). A segment of the Trading Places score can be heard during their scene.

According to Hall, Paramount Pictures insisted on having a white actor in the cast. Paramount Pictures provided a list of three white performers, and Murphy and Hall chose Louie Anderson because they knew him and liked him.

As previously indicated, Coming to America features Murphy and Hall in several different roles, of different races and genders. Following the success of this film, this became a Murphy staple, as seen in four later films: Vampire in Brooklyn (1995); The Nutty Professor (1996) and its sequel (2000); and Norbit (2007).

Production
Coming to America reunited star Eddie Murphy with director John Landis. The two men had previously worked together on the comedy hit Trading Places. Landis recalled the differences in working with Murphy on the two movies: "The guy on Trading Places was young and full of energy and curious and funny and fresh and great. The guy on Coming to America was the pig of the world... But I still think he's wonderful in the movie." Murphy said:

Despite the experience, Landis and Murphy collaborated again six years later on Beverly Hills Cop III.

South African chorus Ladysmith Black Mambazo sings Mbube during the opening sequence (the song also known as The Lion Sleeps Tonight). The group has since recorded several different versions of Mbube; however, the version heard in Coming to America had not been released on its soundtrack or on CD as of 2006.

Murphy received a personal salary of $8 million for his work on the film, plus 15% of film rentals. Landis received $600,000, plus 10% of gross receipts.

Landis's calling card/easter egg, "See You Next Wednesday", appears on a science-fiction movie poster in the subway station after Lisa storms off the train.

A promotional song for the film, also titled "Coming to America", was written and performed by The System.

Release
Paramount cancelled press screenings of the film after initial negative reactions to a press screening in New York City.

Box-office
Released on June 29, 1988, by Paramount Pictures in the United States, it was a commercial box-office success, both domestically and worldwide. The film debuted at number one with $21,404,420 from 2,064 screens, for a five-day total of $28,409,497. The film made $128,152,301 in the United States and ended up with a worldwide total of $288,752,301. It was the highest earning film that year for the studio and the third-highest-grossing film at the United States box office.

It opened a month later in the UK and earned $7,712,622 during its seven-week run. It opened on September 2 in West Germany, where it debuted at number one with $3,715,791 from 297 screens. It ended its run after 13 weeks with $15,743,447. Several contemporary articles stated that the worldwide gross for the movie was $350 million.

Reception
Coming To America received positive reviews upon release.
Review-aggregation website Rotten Tomatoes gives the film a score of 73%, based on reviews from 55 critics with an average rating of 6.2/10. The website's critical consensus reads, "Eddie Murphy was in full control at this point, starkly evident in Coming to Americas John Landis' coasting direction." On Metacritic, the film holds a weighted average score of 47 out of 100, based on 16 reviews, indicating "mixed or average reviews". Audiences polled by CinemaScore gave the film an average grade of "A" on an A+ to F scale.

Sheila Benson in the Los Angeles Times called it a "hollow and wearying Eddie Murphy fairy tale" and bemoans, "That an Eddie Murphy movie would come to this." Vincent Canby in The New York Times was also critical of the writing, calling it a "possibly funny idea" but suggesting the screenplay had escaped before it was ready. Canby viewed the film as essentially a romantic comedy but said the romantic elements fell flat, and the film instead goes for broad slapstick. Siskel & Ebert had mixed opinions on the film. Siskel enjoyed the acting from Murphy and Hall but Ebert was disappointed that Murphy did not bring his usual more lively performance, and Ebert was also critical of the unoriginal script.

Awards

The film was nominated for two Oscars: Best Costume Design for Deborah Nadoolman Landis and Best Makeup for Rick Baker, who designed the makeup effects for both Murphy's and Arsenio Hall's multiple supporting characters.

Lawsuit
The film was the subject of the Buchwald v. Paramount civil suit, which the humorist Art Buchwald filed in 1990 against the film's producers on the grounds that the film's idea was stolen from his 1982 script treatment about a rich, despotic African potentate who comes to America for a state visit. Paramount had optioned the treatment from Buchwald, and John Landis was attached as director and Eddie Murphy as the lead, but after two years of development hell Paramount abandoned the project in March 1985. In 1987, Paramount began working on Coming to America based on a story by Eddie Murphy. Buchwald won the breach of contract action and the court ordered monetary damages. The parties later settled the case out-of-court before an appeal going to trial.

In August 2022, Paramount filed a lawsuit against JMC Pop Ups LLC for creating a temporary version of McDowell's, the fictional fast food restaurant similar to McDonald's, via the Copyright Claims Board, a tribunal created in 2020 to deal with such matters. The pop up restaurant had operated in Springfield, Virginia, and Cherry Hill, New Jersey, in 2022 prior to the suit. McDowell's was featured in both the original movie and its sequel.

Home media 
Coming to America was released on DVD on June 3, 2008. The Film was released on Blu-Ray on June 3, 2008, and re-released on Blu-Ray on January 1, 2013 and on June 12, 2018. Coming To America was released on 4K Blu-Ray on December 1, 2020.

Soundtrack

The soundtrack to the film was released on LP, cassette and CD. The songs "Coming to America" by The System, "Better Late Than Never" by The Cover Girls and "Come into My Life" by Laura Branigan and Joe Esposito were released as singles from the album. "That's The Way It Is" by Mel & Kim had been released as a single in the UK, before the film's release, in February 1988, and became a top ten hit. It was released as a single in the US at the time of the film's release.

Side A
 "Coming to America" — The System (3:49)
 "Better Late Than Never" — The Cover Girls (4:02)
 "All Dressed Up (Ready to Hit the Town)" — Chico DeBarge (4:50)
 "I Like It Like That" — Michael Rodgers (4:01)
 "That's the Way It Is" — Mel and Kim (3:25)

Side B
 "Addicted to You" — LeVert (3:54)
 "Comin' Correct" — J.J. Fad (3:56)
 "Livin' the Good Life" — Sister Sledge (3:46)
 "Transparent" — Nona Hendryx (3:50)
 "Come into My Life" — Laura Branigan and Joe Esposito (4:39)

Soul Glo jingle
The jingle for the commercial for the fictional product Soul Glo was composed by Nile Rodgers, who has suggested it is his "proudest moment". Vocals were provided by Christopher Max.

Legacy

Television pilot

A television pilot of a weekly sitcom version of the film was produced for CBS, following the film's success, starring Tommy Davidson as Prince Tariq, and Paul Bates reprising his role as Oha. The pilot went unsold, but was televised on July 4, 1989, as part of the CBS Summer Playhouse pilot anthology series.

Remakes
A Tamil film, My Dear Marthandan, was produced based on the plot of Coming to America. A Hong Kong film, The Fun, the Luck & the Tycoon, also has the same plot.

Influences in music
The melody heard in the bathroom scene, where Prince Akeem is being washed by female servants, was sampled in Snoop Dogg's 2006 song "That's That" featuring R. Kelly; a remix of the song featuring American rapper Nas includes a woman's voice saying "the royal penis is clean, Your Highness", a line taken from the same scene.

Cultural impact 
The movie has been described as having a "cult following" years after its release, despite negative press, with one of the highest-grossing box office of the year it was released, as well as one of the highest-grossing films featuring a predominantly African-American cast.

Sequel

In early 2017, an announcement was publicized which addressed the impending production of a sequel to the film. Kevin Misher was named as producer, and Sheffield and Blaustein, the original screenwriters, were also attached to the project. However, a possible participation of lead actors Eddie Murphy and Arsenio Hall was left undefined.

On January 11, 2019, it was announced that the sequel will be moving forward with Murphy reprising his role and Craig Brewer as director (having previously worked with Murphy on the Netflix film Dolemite Is My Name). Arsenio Hall, Shari Headley, John Amos, Paul Bates and James Earl Jones were expected to return for the sequel as well. Wesley Snipes signed on for a role in the film. It was reported that Leslie Jones and American rapper Rick Ross were joining the cast in undisclosed roles.

The film was scheduled to be theatrically released on December 18, 2020, but due to the COVID-19 pandemic, Amazon Studios bought the distribution rights and released it digitally on Amazon Prime Video on March 4, 2021.

References

External links

 
 
 
 

1988 films
1980s buddy comedy films
1988 romantic comedy films
African-American films
American buddy comedy films
American romantic comedy films
1980s English-language films
Films about interclass romance
Films about royalty
Films about the upper class
Films directed by John Landis
Films involved in plagiarism controversies
Films set in Africa
Films set in a fictional country
Films set in New York City
Films set in Queens, New York
Monarchy in fiction
Paramount Pictures films
Films produced by George Folsey Jr.
American crossover films
Films with screenplays by Barry W. Blaustein
Films with screenplays by David Sheffield
Coming to America (film series)
Comedy crossover films
1980s American films